The 2002 O'Byrne Cup was a Gaelic football competition played by the county teams of Leinster GAA between November 2001 and January 2002.

The tournament was noted for featuring one of the first inter-county Gaelic football games under floodlights, when Meath played Longford in Simonstown Gaels' ground.

It was won by Carlow, their first and (so far) only win. Captain Andrew Corden died in a car crash just three months after.

Format

The eleven teams are drawn into three groups of 4, 4 and 3 teams respectively.

Each team plays each other team in its group once, earning two points for a win and one for a draw.

The 3 group winners advance the semi-finals.

The runners-up in the two groups of 4 teams play a playoff, with the winner advancing to the semi-finals.

Results

Group stage

Group 1

Group 2

Group 3

Finals

Playoff

Semi-finals

Final

References

External links
Leinster G.A.A. Results 2002

O'Byrne Cup
O'Byrne Cup